Chez Paree Revue was an American variety television series, which aired on the DuMont Television Network in 1950. Very little information exists as to the timeslot, running time, or dates aired.

Format
The show was a musical variety series taking place on the set of a "Parisian" nightclub.

Episode status
As with most DuMont series, no episodes are known to exist.

See also
List of programs broadcast by the DuMont Television Network
List of surviving DuMont Television Network broadcasts
1950–51 United States network television schedule

References

Bibliography
David Weinstein, The Forgotten Network: DuMont and the Birth of American Television (Philadelphia: Temple University Press, 2004) 
Alex McNeil, Total Television, Fourth edition (New York: Penguin Books, 1980) 
Tim Brooks and Earle Marsh, The Complete Directory to Prime Time Network TV Shows, Third edition (New York: Ballantine Books, 1964)

External links
DuMont historical website

DuMont Television Network original programming
Black-and-white American television shows
English-language television shows
1950 American television series debuts
1950 American television series endings
Lost television shows